is a Japanese professional shogi player, ranked 6-dan.

Promotion history
Masuda's promotion history is as follows:

 6-kyū: 1985
 1-dan: 1989
 4-dan: October 1, 1997
 5-dan: November 19, 2002
 6-dan: September 11, 2009

References

External links
ShogiHub: Professional Player Info · Masuda, Yuji

Japanese shogi players
Living people
Professional shogi players
Professional shogi players from Nara Prefecture
1971 births
Free class shogi players